Stanley Ibe (born 19 July 1984) is a Nigerian football striker who currently plays for Meteor Prague.

Career 
Ibe was playing in Nigeria in the Taribo West Academy when he was brought to Italy to Genoa C.F.C.  He spent the first season in the youth team and the following two on loan, first with Serbian side FK Javor Ivanjica helping them to finish first and to win promotion to the First League of FR Yugoslavia, and in the next season he played with Ancona Calcio. Ibe was transferred to Macedonian First League club FK Bregalnica Delčevo in summer 2003.

In July 2004 he signed a contract with Bregalnica Delčevo's league rival FK Sloga Jugomagnat. He played for FK Sloga Jugomagnat till 2005, when was transferred to the Czech club Bohemians Prague. In summer 2006 he had a trial with NK Domzale, afterwards returning to the Czech Republic. During the first half of the 2010–11 season Ibe was on loan with 1. FK Příbram.

In July 2012 he joined the Latvian Higher League club Daugava Daugavpils, reaching his career's highest point so far and participating in the UEFA Champion's League. With 10 goals in 18 appearances during the 2012 Latvian Higher League season Ibe became Daugava's second top scorer and helped the club win the Latvian championship for the first time in its history. After the season, he was included in the sportacentrs.com Team of the Tournament alongside his fellow international Ahmed Abdultaofik from FK Ventspils, both filling the forwards' positions. In 2013 Ibe also helped Daugava lift the Latvian Supercup, scoring the first goal of the game. He left Daugava in October 2013 due to a long-term injury, with 2 goals in 13 league appearances during the 2013 Latvian Higher League season.

In March 2014 Ibe joined the Romanian Liga III side UTA Arad. Having recovered from the injury, he finished the season with 1 goal in 4 league appearances in the Romanian Liga II. His club was relegated from the league after the season.

In December 2014 he signed with the Italian team Olympia Agnonese. He returned to the Czech Republic in August 2015, re-joining Bohemians.

Honours
Daugava Daugavpils
Latvian Supercup: 2013
Latvian Higher League: 2012
Javor
Second League of FR Yugoslavia: 2001–02

References

External links
 
 

1984 births
Living people
Nigerian footballers
Nigerian expatriate footballers
Association football forwards
Genoa C.F.C. players
A.C. Ancona players
Expatriate footballers in Italy
FK Javor Ivanjica players
Expatriate footballers in Serbia and Montenegro
FK Bregalnica Delčevo players
FK Sloga Jugomagnat players
Expatriate footballers in North Macedonia
1. FK Příbram players
FK Bohemians Prague (Střížkov) players
Czech First League players
Expatriate footballers in the Czech Republic
Expatriate footballers in Latvia
Nigerian expatriate sportspeople in Latvia
FC Daugava players
Expatriate footballers in Romania
Nigerian expatriate sportspeople in Romania
FC UTA Arad players